Football is the most popular sport, both in terms of participants and spectators, in Sarajevo. Sarajevo has several of Bosnia and Herzegovina's significant football clubs.

Introduction
FK Željezničar and FK Sarajevo are Sarajevo's most successful clubs.

Koševo Stadium in Sarajevo is Bosnia's biggest stadium.

History 
The game reached Sarajevo in 1903. The city was under Austro-Hungarian rule when official competition began in 1908. At the outbreak of World War I, there were four clubs in Sarajevo; SAŠK, Slavija, Đerzelez (also known as Sarajevski) and Barkohba. After the World War I SAŠK and Slavija played in the Yugoslav First League, both becoming finalists and vice-champions (in 1923 and 1936). Most of the old clubs were dissolved in 1945 and soon many new like Torpedo Sarajevo were founded. Sarajevo became Yugoslav champions in 1967 and 1985, Željezničar in 1972. After the war and dissolution of Yugoslavia all Sarajevo clubs joined the Premier League of Bosnia and Herzegovina.

Clubs 
The table below lists all Sarajevo clubs.

Active

Defunct

Honours 
 Bosnia and Herzegovina Football Champions (10)
 Željezničar (7)
 Sarajevo (3)
 Yugoslav Football Champions (3)
 Sarajevo (2)
 Željezničar (1)
 Bosnian Cup (13)
 Željezničar (6)
 Sarajevo (5)
 Slavija (1)
 Olimpic (1)
 Yugoslav Cup (0)
/
 Super Cup of Bosnia and Herzegovina (3)
 Željezničar (2)
 Sarajevo (1)

Sarajevo derbies 
First Sarajevo derby was between SAŠK and Slavija between 1910 and 1945. After the World War II a major Sarajevo derby between Željezničar and Sarajevo emerged.

Stadia 
 Koševo Stadium
 Grbavica Stadium
 Otoka Stadium
 SRC Slavija
 Hrasnica Stadium

References

See also
Football in Bosnia and Herzegovina

Football in Bosnia and Herzegovina